Year 1353 (MCCCLIII) was a common year starting on Tuesday (link will display the full calendar) of the Julian calendar.

Events 
 January–December 
 March 3 – Bern signs an alliance with the Old Swiss Confederacy.

 Date unknown 
 The Moroccan traveler Ibn Battuta makes the first recorded visit to Timbuktu and Kabara, when returning from a stay in the capital of the Mali Empire.
 The Decameron is finished by Giovanni Boccaccio.
 The Black Death (1331) subsides.
 The Lao kingdom of Lan Xang is founded by Fa Ngum.

Births 
 March – Margaret I of Denmark, queen of Haakon VI of Norway (d. 1412)
 July 15 – Vladimir the Bold, Russian prince (d. 1410)
 date unknown
 Thomas Arundel, Archbishop of Canterbury (d. 1414)
 Helvis of Brunswick-Grubenhagen, queen consort of Armenia and Cyprus (d. 1421)
 John Purvey, English scholar and Bible translator (d. 1428)

Deaths 
 February 2 – Anne of Bavaria, queen consort of Bohemia (b. 1329)
 March 6 – Roger Grey, 1st Baron Grey de Ruthyn
 March 11 – Theognostus, metropolitan of Kiev and Moscow
 April 27 – Simeon of Russia, Grand Prince of Moscow and Vladimir
 October 4 – Rudolf II, Duke of Bavaria (b. 1306)
 November or December – Togha Temür, claimant to the throne of the Mongol Il-Khanate in Persia (assassinated)
 date unknown
 Matilda, daughter of King Robert the Bruce of Scotland
 Elisabeth of Austria, Duchess of Lorraine, regent of Lorraine 
 Sir Ulick Burke, Irish nobleman

References